Tami Hoag (born Tami Mikkelson; January 20, 1959) is an American novelist, best known for her work in the romance and thriller genres. More than 22 million copies of her books are in print.

Biography
Hoag was born in Cresco, Iowa and raised in the small town of Harmony, Minnesota, where her father sold insurance. From childhood, she knew she wanted to be a writer. "I had to spend a lot of time entertaining myself," she told an interviewer in 2016. "I found books at a really young age and fell in love with books."

Hoag's first job after graduating from high school was in the La Crosse Tribune circulation department. Before publishing her first novel, she also worked as a photographer's assistant, trained show horses, and sold designer bathroom accessories. She married and divorced Daniel Hoag, whom she had dated in high school.

Hoag began her career as an author in 1988, writing category romances for the Bantam Books Loveswept Line. After several years of success in that field, Hoag switched her focus to single-title suspense novels. She has had thirteen consecutive New York Times bestsellers, including five in a 20-month span.  Her novel Night Sins became a TV miniseries starring Valerie Bertinelli and Harry Hamlin.  Hoag has been invited to do a reading at one of Barbara Bush's literacy functions.

Hoag and three other authors who made the leap from romance to thrillers at roughly the same time (Eileen Dreyer, Elizabeth Grayson, and Kimberly Cates) have formed a group they call the Divas. The group provides support and encouragement for each other, and Hoag often thanks them in the acknowledgement section of her books.

Hoag owns horses, and often goes for a ride to combat writer's block. She has competed in dressage at a national level, but stopped competing after breaking five vertebrae in her back during a fall while trying out a horse for a friend.  Hoag is fully recovered from her accident, and has returned to the competition arena. She currently lives in Malibu, California, and Wellington, Florida.

Bibliography

Standalone novels
 McKnight in Shining Armor (1988, Loveswept #276), (2009) Reissue 
 Mismatch (1989, Loveswept #315), (2008) Reissue
 Sarah's Sin (1991, Loveswept #480)
 Heart of Dixie (1991, Loveswept #493), (2008) Reissue 
 Taken by Storm (1992, Loveswept #532), (2007) Reissue
 Still Waters (1992, Bantam Fanfare)
 The Last White Knight (1992, Loveswept #561)
 Dark Paradise (1994, Bantam Books)
 Kill the Messenger (2004, Bantam Books)

Oak Knoll series
 Deeper than the Dead (2009)
 Secrets to the Grave (2010)
 Down the Darkest Road (2011)

Elena Estes series
 Dark Horse (2002)
 The Alibi Man (2007)

Kovac & Liska series
 Ashes to Ashes (1999)
 Dust to Dust (2000)
 Prior Bad Acts (2006) also known as Dead Sky
 The 1st Victim (2014, an e-book short story)
 The 9th Girl (2013)
 Cold Cold Heart (2015, Dutton)
 The Bitter Season (2016)

Deer Lake series
 Night Sins (1995)
 Guilty as Sin (1996)

Doucet series
 The Restless Heart (1991, Loveswept #458), (2007) Reissue
 Lucky's Lady (1992)
 Cry Wolf (1993)
 A Thin Dark Line (1997)
 The Boy (2018)
 Bad Liar (2023)

Hennessy series
 The Trouble with J.J. (1988, Loveswept #253), (2009) Reissue
 Magic (1990, Bantam Fanfare, also in The Rainbow Chasers series)

Lynn Shaw
 Straight from the Heart (1989, Loveswept #351), (2007) Reissue
 Last White Knight (1992, Loveswept #561), (2008) Reissue

Quaid Horses series
 Rumor Has It (1989, Loveswept #304), (2009) Reissue
 Man of Her Dreams (1989, Loveswept #331) (2008) Reissue
 Tempestuous (1990, Loveswept #434), (2007) Reissue

The Rainbow Chasers series
 Heart of Gold (1990, Loveswept #393), (2010) Reissue
 Keeping Company (1990, Loveswept #405), (2010) Reissue
 Reilly's Return (1990, Loveswept #417), (2010) Reissue
 Magic (1990, Bantam Fanfare, also in the Hennessy series)

Notes

Sources

External links
 
 

Living people
1959 births
People from Malibu, California
People from Wellington, Florida
American romantic fiction writers
American thriller writers
American dressage riders
American women novelists
Women thriller writers
Women romantic fiction writers
20th-century American novelists
20th-century American women writers
21st-century American novelists
21st-century American women writers
People from Cresco, Iowa
People from Harmony, Minnesota
Novelists from Iowa
Novelists from Minnesota
Novelists from Florida
Novelists from California